Cyanopindolol is a drug related to pindolol which acts as both a β1 adrenoceptor antagonist and a 5-HT1A receptor antagonist. Its radiolabelled derivative iodocyanopindolol has been widely used in mapping the distribution of beta adrenoreceptors in the body.

References 

5-HT1A antagonists
Beta blockers
Indoles
Nitriles
N-tert-butyl-phenoxypropanolamines